Liverpool Blues may refer to:

 The Liverpool Blues (Regiment), volunteer infantry regiment 1745–46
 The 79th Regiment of Foot (Royal Liverpool Volunteers), nickname of infantry regiment of the British Army 1778–84
 The Liverpool Blues (Australian rules football), Australian rules football club